Clemens von Grumbkow (born 22 July 1983) is a German international rugby union player, playing for the U.S. Dax in the French Rugby Pro D2. He made his debut for Germany in a game against Poland in 2003.

Biography
Von Grumbkow was born in Leimen, and originally played for SC Neuenheim in Germany, being part of the club's national championship-winning team in 2003 and 2004, before joining New Zealand club Stoke RFC for the 2005 season. From 2006 to 2009, he played for French club RC Orléans, a club with a number of German internationals in its ranks at the time. From 2009, he played in Italy's highest league, the Super 10 (now Top12), for Rugby Club I Cavalieri Prato. At the end of the 2011–12 season he switched to the French second division side U.S. Dax.

Von Grumbkow is also regularly part of the German sevens squad and played for his country at the 2005 World Games in Duisburg and the 2009 London Sevens.

Honours

Club
 German rugby union championship
 Champions: 2003, 2004

National team
 European Nations Cup – Division 2
 Champions: 2008

Stats
Clemens von Grumbkow's personal statistics in club and international rugby:

National team

European Nations Cup

Friendlies & other competitions

 As of 28 April 2013

Club

 As of 30 April 2012

References

External links
 
 Rugby Club I Cavalieri Prato website – Clemens von Grumbkow 
} Clemens von Grumbkow profile at totalrugby.de 
 Clemens von Grumbkow profile at itsrugby.fr 
 Clemens von Grumbkow at the DRV website 

1983 births
Living people
German rugby union players
Germany international rugby union players
Expatriate rugby union players in France
Cavalieri Prato players
RC Orléans players
SC Neuenheim players
Rugby union centres
People from Leimen (Baden)
Sportspeople from Karlsruhe (region)
Expatriate rugby union players in New Zealand
Expatriate rugby union players in Italy
German expatriate sportspeople in France
German expatriate sportspeople in New Zealand
German expatriate sportspeople in Italy
German expatriate rugby union players
US Dax players